Waphare Wadi is a small village in the Ahmednagar district of Maharashtra, India. It comes under the Karjule Harya panchayat of the Parner block.

References 

Villages in Ahmednagar district